The 2022 UCI ProSeries is the third season of the UCI ProSeries, the second tier road cycling tour, below the UCI World Tour, but above the various regional UCI Continental Circuits.

The original calendar consisted of 56 events, of which 30 are one-day races (1.Pro), and 26 are stage races (2.Pro). There are 47 events in Europe, six in Asia, two in the United States, and one in Argentina.

Events

Notes

References

 
2022
UCI ProSeries